The David Conklin House is a historic house located at Huntington in Suffolk County, New York, on the southwest corner of High Street (Suffolk CR 92) and New York Avenue (New York State Route 110).

Description and history 
It is a -story, three-bay wide, gable-roofed dwelling with a -story, five-bay gable-roofed east wing and a -story, five-bay hip-roofed southwest wing. The main and original portion was built in about 1750. Also on the property are a privy and well house. It is occupied by the Huntington Historical Society.

It was added to the National Register of Historic Places on September 26, 1985.

References

External links
The 1750 David Conklin Farmhouse Museum (Official site)

Houses on the National Register of Historic Places in New York (state)
Houses completed in 1750
Houses in Suffolk County, New York
Museums in Suffolk County, New York
Historic house museums in New York (state)
National Register of Historic Places in Suffolk County, New York